Wuxi Boston International School (BIS) is an international school located in Xinwu District in Wuxi, China. BIS was opened in the 2017–2018 school year. Enrollment is open to students from pre-kindergarten to grade 12.

BIS follows the International Baccalaureate curriculum. Brian Rotunno is the Academic Principal and David Bremner is the Academic Principal Assistant.

Notes

External links
 Boston International School homepage

International schools in Jiangsu
Education in Wuxi